The Devereux is a pub at No. 20 Devereux Court, off Essex Street, London WC2.

It is a Grade II listed building that was built in about 1676 as the Grecian Coffee House. It was refurbished as a pub in 1843.

References

External links

Grade II listed pubs in the City of Westminster